The following is a list of people executed by the U.S. state of Texas between 2000 and 2009. All of the 248 people (246 males and 2 females) during this period were convicted of murder and have been executed by lethal injection at the Huntsville Unit in Huntsville, Texas. The count is the most of any decade in Texas history, surpassing the 166 executions from the previous decade (1990–1999).

Executions 2000–2009
The number in the "#" column indicates the nth person executed since 1982 (when Texas resumed the death penalty). As an example, Earl Carl Heiselbetz Jr. (the first person executed in Texas during the 2000 decade) was the 200th person executed since resumption of the death penalty.

Notes

See also
Capital punishment in Texas
List of people executed in Texas, 2020–present

References

External links
Narratives of family members of the executed. Narratives from the mother of A. Fuentes, the father and brother of N. Beazley, the sister of J. Colburn and the mother of J. Nichols.
Death Row Information. Texas Department of Criminal Justice

2000
Executed
People executed in Texas, 2000-09

Executed in Texas, 2000-09